The canyons of the Teton Range lie almost entirely within Grand Teton National Park in the U.S. state of Wyoming. The canyons in the Teton Range descend in altitude generally west to east and many have lakes at their outlets. The lakes were created by terminal moraines left behind by the now retreated glaciers. A few of the canyons have small glaciers that were created mostly during the Little Ice Age (1550-1850). Fast retreating Schoolroom Glacier is a tiny glacier located at the head of the South Cascade Canyon. Most of the canyons have streams from which rain and snowmelt flow towards Jackson Hole valley, and due to the sometimes rapid altitude descent, waterfalls are common. The canyons offer the easiest hiking access into the Teton Range.

Teton Range canyons within Grand Teton National Park 

Moose Creek flows through the canyon and empties into Jackson Lake.
Several cascades near the head of the canyon descend from an unnamed lake.
Snowshoe Canyon has a north and south fork.
The canyon outlet is at Moran Bay on Jackson Lake.
The canyon outlet is at Leigh Lake.
The popular but very strenuous Paintbrush-Cascade Loop hike traverses through the canyon.
One of the most visited canyons in Grand Teton National Park, Cascade Canyon can be accessed by trail via a loop hike around Jenny Lake or a boat shuttle which provides easier access to Inspiration Point and the nearly  cascade known as Hidden Falls. Schoolroom Glacier is located at the head of the South Cascade Canyon while Lake Solitude lies at the end of the North Cascade Canyon.
Valhalla Canyon extends northward  from the northwestern slopes of Grand Teton and ends within Cascade Canyon.

The terminal moraine at the outlet of Garnet Canyon impounds Bradley Lake. 
Both Snowdrift Lake and Lake Taminah are within the canyon. South Teton and Cloudveil Dome are to the north and Mount Wister is to the south of the canyon. The terminal moraine at the outlet of Avalanche Canyon impounds Taggart Lake.
Death Canyon is a popular hiking destination.
Granite Canyon is the southernmost canyon in Grand Teton National Park.

Teton Range canyons outside Grand Teton National Park 
Jensen Canyon is located to the south of Grand Teton National Park in Bridger-Teton National Forest.
Phillips Canyon is located to the south of Grand Teton National Park in Bridger-Teton National Forest.
Teton Canyon is on the west slopes of the Teton Range and within Caribou-Targhee National Forest.
Darby Canyon is on the west slopes of the Teton Range and within Caribou-Targhee National Forest.

See also
 Geology of the Grand Teton area

References

Canyons and gorges of Grand Teton National Park
Canyons and gorges of Wyoming